Mohammad Sewar is a Yemeni politician. He quit his position as Assistant Secretary General of the Cabinet over the 2011 Yemeni uprising.

See also
Politics of Yemen

References

Living people
Year of birth missing (living people)
Place of birth missing (living people)
21st-century Yemeni politicians